The Mayor of Ferrara is an elected politician who, along with Ferrara City Council, is accountable for the strategic government of Ferrara in Emilia-Romagna, Italy. The current Mayor is Alan Fabbri, a member of the right-wing populist party Lega Nord, who took office on 11 June 2019.

Overview
According to the Italian Constitution, the Mayor of Ferrara is member of the City Council.

The Mayor is elected by the population of Ferrara, who also elect the members of the City Council, controlling the Mayor's policy guidelines and is able to enforce his resignation by a motion of no confidence. The Mayor is entitled to appoint and release the members of his government.

Since 1995 the Mayor is elected directly by Ferrara's electorate: in all mayoral elections in Italy in cities with a population higher than 15,000 the voters express a direct choice for the mayor or an indirect choice voting for the party of the candidate's coalition. If no candidate receives at least 50% of votes, the top two candidates go to a second round after two weeks. The election of the City Council is based on a direct choice for the candidate with a preference vote: the candidate with the majority of the preferences is elected. The number of the seats for each party is determined proportionally.

1105–1946

Italian Republic (since 1946)

City Council election (1946–1995)
From 1946 to 1995, the Mayor of Ferrara was elected by the City's Council.

Direct election (since 1995)
Since 1995, under provisions of new local administration law, the Mayor of Ferrara is chosen by direct election.

Timeline

See also
 Timeline of Ferrara

References

External links
 

Ferrara
Mayors of places in Emilia-Romagna
People from Ferrara
Politics of Emilia-Romagna
Ferrara